Israil Bercovici (1921–1988) was a Jewish Romanian dramaturg, playwright, director, biographer, and memoirist, who served the State Jewish Theater of Romania between 1955 and 1982; he also wrote Yiddish-language poetry.

Biography
Bercovici was born into a poor working-class family in Botoşani, Romania, and received a traditional Jewish education. During World War II he served time at hard labor until the arrival of the Soviet Army in Romania.

After the war, he began his career in Yiddish-language newspapers and radio, notably the weekly IKUF-Bleter (1946–1953), and the Revista Cultului Mozaic din R.P.R. (Journal of Jewish Culture in the People's Republic of Romania, also known as Tsaytshrift). The Journal was launched in 1956 and had sections in Romanian, Yiddish and Hebrew. Bercovici edited the Yiddish section from 1970 to 1972.

As a literature student after the war at a secular secondary school in Bucharest, Bercovici published his first Yiddish-language poetry in IKUF-Bleter. Judging by theater reviews he wrote in the early 1950s, he appears to have been an ardent Communist, grateful for his liberation from the labor camp and for the opportunity to receive a secular education, advocating a socialist realist aesthetic for Yiddish-language theater.

His affiliation with the State Jewish Theater began in 1955, initially as "literarischer Sekretär". He continued to be very aware of developments in theater beyond the Yiddish language: he drove the theater toward being a contemporary theater, rather than a mere museum of inherited plays. Elvira Groezinger compares his goals to those of New York City's Arbeter Teater Farband (ARTEF, "Workers' Theatre Society"), goals well-aligned with those of the Communist regime.

Bercovici translated works from world literature: Friedrich Dürrenmatt's Frank V (1964), Karl Gutzkow's Uriel Acosta (1968), and Henrik Ibsen's The Master Builder (1972), and wrote his own Yiddish-language plays, including Der goldener fodem ("The Golden Thread", 1963), about Abraham Goldfaden (who in 1876 founded the world's first Yiddish-language theater, in Iaşi, Romania), and the musical revue A shnirl perl ("A Pearl Necklace", 1967). He also wrote books about Yiddish theater history.

In 1976 he directed a celebration of 100 years of Yiddish theatre in Romania, which included not only performances of his own work but also those of Goldfaden and Sholem Aleichem.

Toward the end of Bercovici's career, in Romania, as elsewhere in Europe, Yiddish was a language in decline. The State Jewish Theater coped, in part, by installing headphones throughout the theater to allow simultaneous translation of the plays into Romanian; the system is still in use when the theater performs Yiddish-language plays today.

Bercovici's 3000-volume Yiddish-language library is now part of the University Library in Potsdam.

Works for theater
The following list is drawn from Bercovici's own history of Yiddish theater in Romania ([Bercovici 1998]). The list may be incomplete; many of Bercovici's works were musical and folkloric revues and some were reworkings of Purim plays. The music for most of Bercovici's plays was composed by Haim Schwartzmann; "The Golden Thread" also uses music by Avram Goldfaden, whom the play is about. Schwartzmann and Eugen Koffler contributed music for A Pearl Necklace and Baraşeum '72; Mangheriada used music by Schwartzmann, Koffler, Dubi Seltzer, Henech Kon, and Simha Schwartz; a 1976 production of "The Golden Thread" credits additional music by Adalbert Winkler.

The list contains Romanian-language titles and Yiddish-language titles with Romanian phonetic transcription. Some works had only a Romanian language title; when titles in both languages are given by Bercovici, the Romanian title precedes the Yiddish. Unless otherwise noted, the date given is that of first performance by the State Jewish Theater.

 Revista revistelor ("Revue of Revues"), December 15, 1958.
 Un cîntec şi o glumă / A lid mit a viţ ("A Song and a Joke"), April 15, 1958.
 O revistă cu Ahaşveroş ("A revue with Ahasuerus"), December 30, 1959.
 Ciri-biri-bom, cowritten with Aurel Storin, Moişe Bălan, Malvina Cohn, December 30, 1960.
 Oaspeţi în Oraş / Ghest in ştot ("Guests in the City"), April 15, 1961.
 O seară de folclor evreiesc / An ovnt fun idişn folklor ("An Evening of Yiddish Folklore"), October 4, 1962.
 Cu cîntec spre stele / Mit a lid ţu di ştern ("With a Song to the Stars"), February 13, 1963.
 Purim-şpil ("Purim play"), March 24, 1963.
 Recital de dansuri, versuri şi cîntece ("Dance, Poetry and Song Show"), April 7, 1963.
 Spectacol de umor şi folclor muzical evreiesc / Idişer humor un musicakişer folklor ("Yiddish Humor and Musical Folklore")
 Firul de aur / Der goldener fodem ("The Golden Thread"), October 25, 1963.
 Un şirag de perle / A şnirl perl ("A String of Pearls"), April 2, 1967.
 Amintiri de revelion / Nai-iur-zihroines ("New Year's Memories"), December 31, 1967.
 Cîntarea cîntărilor ("Song of Songs"), an experimental Romanian-language theater piece, based on Hebrew poetry, March 5, 1968.
 Mangheriada, based on the poems of Itzik Manger, April 6, 1968.
 Baraşeum '72, February 5, 1972. (Baraşeum was the old name of the future State Jewish Theater, honoring Jewish culture promoter, Dr. Iuliu Barasch.)
 Scrisori pe portativ ("Letters on a Musical Staff"), August 16, 1975.

Published works
Bercovici published three major books of Yiddish poetry: 

  (1978, "Sparks Over Generations")
  (1984, "Flying Letters")

In addition, Bercovici and Nana Cassian translated into Romanian the work of Yiddish-language poet Itzik Manger.

He also published on the history of the Yiddish Theatre in Romania:

  (1973)

References

 Dalinger, Brigitte, English-language review of [Groezinger, 2003] from All About Jewish Theatre.
 Bercovici, Israil, O sută de ani de teatru evreiesc în România ("One hundred years of Yiddish/Jewish theater in Romania"), 2nd Romanian-language edition, revised and augmented by Constantin Măciucă. Editura Integral (an imprint of Editurile Universala), Bucharest (1998). . The first Romanian edition was 1982, Editura Kriterion :ro:Editura Kriterion . There also was a 1976 edition, also from Editura Kriterion, in Yiddish: Hundert ior idiş teater in Rumenie. Bercovici did his own translation into Romanian.

External links
 Israil Bercovici books in the Yiddish Book Center collection (in Yiddish)

See also 
 List of Jewish Romanians

1921 births
1988 deaths
Yiddish theatre
Yiddish-language poets
Moldavian Jews
Jewish Romanian writers
Jewish socialists
Romanian theatre directors
Romanian dramatists and playwrights
Romanian male poets
Romanian memoirists
Romanian biographers
Male biographers
People from Botoșani
20th-century Romanian poets
20th-century Romanian dramatists and playwrights
Male dramatists and playwrights
20th-century Romanian male writers
20th-century memoirists